German submarine U-779 was a Type VIIC U-boat of Nazi Germany's Kriegsmarine during World War II.

She was ordered on 20 January 1941, and was laid down on 21 July 1943, at Kriegsmarinewerft, Wilhelmshaven, as yard number 162. She was launched on 17 June 1944, and commissioned under the command of Oberleutnant zur See Johann Stegmann on 24 August 1944.

Design
German Type VIIC submarines were preceded by the shorter Type VIIB submarines. U-779 had a displacement of  when at the surface and  while submerged. She had two shafts and two  propellers.

U-779 was fitted with five  torpedo tubes (four fitted at the bow and one at the stern), fourteen torpedoes or 26 TMA mines, one  SK C/35 naval gun, (220 rounds), one  Flak M42 and two twin  C/30 anti-aircraft guns. The boat had a complement of between 44 — 52 men.

Service history
U-779 did not participate in any war patrols.

On 5 May 1945, U-779 surrendered at Cuxhaven, Germany. She was later transferred to Loch Ryan, Scotland on 24 June 1945, from Wilhelmshaven. Of the 156 U-boats that eventually surrendered to the Allied forces at the end of the war, U-779 was one of 116 selected to take part in Operation Deadlight. U-779 was towed out and sank on 17 December 1945, by gunfire from the British destroyer  and the frigate .

References

Bibliography

External links

German Type VIIC submarines
U-boats commissioned in 1944
World War II submarines of Germany
Ships built in Wilhelmshaven
1944 ships
Maritime incidents in December 1945
World War II shipwrecks in the Atlantic Ocean
Operation Deadlight
U-boats sunk by British warships